Indian Hill High School is a public high school near Cincinnati, Ohio.  It is the only public high school in the Indian Hill Exempted Village School District. 

In 2022 Indian Hill was ranked #198 in the National Rankings and #5 in the State of Ohio. In 2007, Indian Hill High School was ranked 48th in the nation in U.S. News & World Report Top 100 High Schools, placing it ahead of Walnut Hills High School and Wyoming High School as the top public high school in the Tri-State area, though Walnut Hills High School and Wyoming High School overtook Indian Hill once again in the most recent state rankings. In addition, it placed 116th on Newsweek Magazine's 2009 Top 1500 High School Rankings and was named a 2007 U.S. Blue Ribbon School.

Academics
Indian Hill High School offers a very vigorous college-prep curriculum, mainly in the honors and AP courses. The school offers a total of 21 AP courses.  Students are required to take the AP exam if they take the AP course. In the spring of 2007, 266 students took 682 Advanced Placement exams. 83 percent of these students received a 3 or better on the exams. In the class of 2007, Indian Hill also boasted 73 AP Scholars and 20 National Merit Semi-Finalists/Commended Students, representing 36 percent and 10 percent of the class, respectively. The school also offers a nationally recognized Latin program; the Latin Club functions as a local chapter of both the Ohio Junior Classical League (OJCL) and National Junior Classical League (NJCL), and Indian Hill's Latin chair recently served as president of the American Classical League (ACL).

Athletics

Indian Hill has been a long time member of the Cincinnati Hills League. The Braves share a heated rivalry with league foe Wyoming High School.

The Indian Hill Braves have seen recent success in Football, Tennis, Swimming, Girls Soccer, and Track & Field. In Tennis, the Girls have won 25 consecutive CHL titles. The boys' Tennis team has won the CHL every year but two in the history of the league and for 4 straight years (2014-2017) were ranked #1 in the state for Division 2.

Ohio High School Athletic Association State Championships

 Boys Swimming and Diving - 2020
 Girls Track & Field - 2019
 Girls Soccer - 2017, 2018
 Girls Lacrosse - 2017
 Boys Lacrosse - 1999, 2000, 2002
 Girls Tennis - 1981, 1984, 1985, 1987, 2013
 Boys Tennis - 1996, 1998, 2001, 2003, 2004, 2006, 2022

Mock Trial Program

Indian Hill's Mock Trial program has won the State Championship in Ohio five times. Indian Hill’s Mock Trial program also placed first and won the international Empire Atlanta tournament in 2018, becoming the first undefeated champion.  Reaching the finals in 2002, 2009, 2010, 2012, 2013, and 2017, Indian Hill won the title in 2009, 2010, 2012, 2013, and 2017.  Having already competed at Nationals in Atlanta (2009), Philadelphia (2010), Albuquerque (2012), and Indianapolis (2013), Indian Hill's latest State Championship victory qualifies them to compete in the 2017 National Mock Trial Tournament in Hartford, Connecticut.  Indian Hill's best placements at the State competition are as follows:

2002:  2nd place;  2006:  3rd and 4th place;  2007:  3rd and 4th place;  2009:  1st and 6th place;  2010:  1st place;  2011:  3rd place;  2012:  1st place;  2013:  1st place;  2014:  5th place;  2016:  5th place;  2017:  1st and 3rd place; 2018: 3rd and 7th place.

Notable alumni

Ted Bolser, TE drafted by the Redskins in 2014
Michael Gruber, Broadway actor
Paul Hackett, Democratic politician, Iraqi War Veteran
Julie Hagerty, actress and former model
Chris Kempczinski, CEO of McDonald's
Tom Tsuchiya, sculptor

Notes and references

External links
U.S. News & World Report: Indian Hill High School Video 
 District Website
 High School Website

High schools in Hamilton County, Ohio
Indian Hill, Ohio
Public high schools in Ohio